Soil regeneration, as a particular form of ecological regeneration within the field of restoration ecology, is creating new soil and rejuvenating soil health by: minimizing the loss of topsoil, retaining more carbon than is depleted, boosting biodiversity, and maintaining proper water and nutrient cycling. This has many benefits, such as: soil sequestration of carbon in response to a growing threat of climate change, a reduced risk of soil erosion, and increased overall soil resilience.

Soil basics

Soil quality 

Soil quality means the ability of the soil to "perform its functions." Soil is integral to a variety of ecosystem services. These services include food, animal feed, and fiber production, climate moderation, waste disposal, water filtration, elemental cycling, and much more. Soil is composed of organic matter (decomposing plants, animals, and microbes), biomass (living plants, animals, and microbes), water, air, minerals (sand, silt, and clay), and nutrients (nitrogen, carbon, phosphorus). For optimal plant growth, a proper carbon to nitrogen ratio of 20–30:1 must be maintained. Promoting biodiversity is key to maintaining healthy soil. This can be done by growing a variety of plants, always keeping soil covered, maintaining a living root system, and minimizing soil disturbance. Macro and micro organisms assist with processes such as decomposition, nutrient cycling, disease suppression, and moderating CO2 in the atmosphere. Plants have a particularly symbiotic relationship with microbes in the rhizosphere of the soil. The rhizosphere is an "area of concentrated microbial activity close to the root" and where water and nutrients are readily available. Plants exchange carbohydrates for nutrients excreted by the microbes, different carbohydrates support different microbes. Dead plants and other organic matter also feed the variety of organisms in the soil. Organisms like earthworms and termites are examples of macro organisms in the soil. A good indication that you have quality soil is a lack of pests and diseases. Low biodiversity increases the risk of pests and diseases.

Soil degradation 

Having too much or too little of any of the components of soil can cause soil degradation. For example, having a high clay content reduces aeration and water permeability. Another example is that, though phosphorus and nitrogen are essential for plant growth, they are toxic in high amounts. Soil degradation means that soil quality has diminished, which causes ecosystem functions to decline. One third of the globe's land has degraded soil; especially the tropics and subtropics with around 500 million hectares. Soil degradation occurs due to physical, chemical, and biological forces. These forces can be natural and anthropogenic. Tilling is a physical example which causes erosion, compaction, and decreased microbial activity. Erosion is “one of the most serious problems facing urban soil quality", and the problem is exacerbated by uncovered soil. Compaction occurs when soil is pushed together and becomes harder, so the ability to retain air and water is diminished. This increases erosion and flooding, diminishes the ability of plants to grow good root systems, and reduces biological diversity. Overgrazing is another example in which the root system beneath the soil is damaged, reducing water permeability. Acidification, salinization, nutrient leaching, and toxin contamination are a few types of chemical degradation. Toxins can accumulate in the soil from industrial processes like mining and waste management. Some biological examples include biodiversity loss, emitting greenhouse gasses, reduced carbon content, and a reduced capacity to sequester carbon. One of the most predictable ways to determine whether soil degradation has occurred is to measure its organic carbon content. The soil organic carbon pool is extremely important for soil fertility.

Climate change and the carbon cycle 
There is a significant connection between the carbon cycle and climate change. Most greenhouse gases are primarily composed of carbon and they produce an effect where warmer air that is heated by the sun is kept from leaving the atmosphere by forming a barrier in the troposphere. According to the Intergovernmental Panel on Climate Change, greenhouse gasses produced by human activity are the most significant cause of global climate change since the 1950s. Without human interaction, carbon is removed from and reintroduced to soil through a variety of ecosystem processes known as the carbon cycle. Humans have been significantly influencing the global carbon cycle since the Industrial Revolution through various means, such as transportation and agriculture. Through these actions, most of this carbon has moved in one direction, from the lithosphere and biospheres to the atmosphere. By means of fossil fuels and intensive farming, much of the natural carbon in the Earth's pedosphere has been released into the atmosphere, contributing to greenhouse gasses.

Regenerative practices 
"Soil works for you if you work for the soil." There are many ways to regenerate soil and improve soil quality, such as land management by conservation agriculture. Agriculture is one of the main factors in the depletion of soil richness in human history. Certain agricultural practices can deplete soil of carbon, such as monoculture where only one type of crop is harvested in a field season after season. This depletes nutrients from the soil because each type of plant has a specific set of nutrients that it requires to grow or that it can fix back into the soil. With a lack of plant diversity, only certain nutrients will be absorbed. Over time, these nutrients will be depleted from the soil. Agroecology is an overarching category of approaches to creating a more sustainable agricultural system and increasing the health of soil. These conservation agricultural practices utilize many techniques and resources to maintain healthy soil. Some examples are cover cropping, crop rotation, reducing soil disturbance, retaining mulch, and integrated nutrient management. These practices have many benefits, including increased carbon sequestration and reducing the use of fossil fuels.

Permaculture (from "permanent" and "agriculture") is a type of conservation agriculture which is a systems thinking approach that seeks to increase the carbon content of soil by utilizing natural patterns and processes. There is a strong emphasis on knowledge of plants, animals, and natural cycles to promote high efficiency food production, decrease reliance on human involvement, and create a sustainable and resilient ecosystem. This can be accomplished through techniques that involve intentional landscaping to increase the efficiency of capturing rainfall into the system or by placing nitrogen fixing plants near nitrogen demanding plants, such as legumes. Utilization of the interconnections of various plants, animals, and processes is a key practice in permaculture. Native plants should be used whenever possible, their roots help water infiltrate deep into the soil. Agroecology also includes the idea of holistic management. This approach stems from the work of Allan Savory who claims that planned grazing can improve soil health and reverse the effects of desertification by increasing biomass. Desertification occurs when the soil carbon content is severely depleted, greatly reducing soil fertility. This critically inhibits plant growth: without plants soil cannot hold water sufficiently, and becomes dry and brittle over time. Permaculture and holistic management are two different methods that focus on regenerating biomass, nutrient content, and biodiversity to the soil. The more biomass in the soil, the more carbon can be sequestered to sustain the natural ecosystem.

There are also many kinds of soil amendments, both organic or inorganic. They promote soil quality in a variety of ways such as: sequestering toxins, balancing the pH of the soil, adding nutrients, and promoting the activity of organisms. The current conditions of the soil will determine which type of amendment and how much to use. Inorganic amendments are generally used for things like improving the texture and structure of the soil, balancing the pH, and limiting the bioavailability of heavy metal toxins. There are two types of inorganic amendments, alkaline and mineral. Some examples of inorganic amendments include wood ash, ground limestone, and red mud. Mineral amendments include gypsum and dredged materials. Organic amendments improve biological activity, water permeability, and soil structure. Mulch, for example, reduces erosion and helps to maintain the temperature of the soil. Compost is rich in organic matter, it is composed of decomposed matter such as food, vegetation, and animal wastes. Adding compost increases the moisture and nutrient content of the soil, and promotes biological activity. Creating compost requires careful management of temperature, the carbon to nitrogen ratio, water, and air. Biochar is an amendment that is full of carbon and is created by pyrolysis, a high temperature decomposition process. Wastes from animals are common soil amendments, usually their manure. The moisture and nutrient content will vary depending on the animal it came from. Human wastes can also be used, like the byproduct biosolids from wastewater facilities. Biosolids can be high in nutrient content, so should be used sparingly.

See also 
Carbon cycle
Climate change
Environmental soil science
Land restoration
Regenerative agriculture
Soil carbon feedback

References 

Carbon dioxide removal
Environmental soil science